Bourkelands is a rapidly developing southern suburb of Wagga Wagga in southern New South Wales, Australia which is named after a property which was located within the suburb. The suburb consists predominantly of real estate display homes and housing for military staff at the nearby RAAF Base Wagga and Army Recruit Training Centre. The suburb borders Red Hill Road and is within walking distance of the Tolland shopping centre and Jubilee Park/Oval and contains two play parks. The suburb also contains the area which is commonly marketed by real estate agents and developers as Hilltop, as the name Hilltop is not registered locality.

A large LDS Church was constructed in the suburb in 2005.

Bourkelands was built in 1943 16th of October was when the building was completed. Streets in Bourkelands are named after 'Important pastoral homesteads of the region'.

References

External links 

Suburbs of Wagga Wagga